Virginia Torrecilla Reyes (born 4 September 1994), simply known as Virginia, is a Spanish professional footballer who plays for Atlético Madrid in the Spanish Primera División, having also previously played for FC Barcelona and French Division 1 Féminine team Montpellier HSC. She also represents the Spain women's national football team at senior international level. A versatile player, Torrecilla can perform in the full-back, midfield or forward positions.

Club career
Torrecilla started her football career in Serverense when she was 11 years old, progressing through the youth system at CD Serverense. At 15 years old she joined UD Collerense and went straight into the first team, becoming one of the youngest players to debut in the Superliga Femenina.

After two years, Torrecilla joined Sporting Atlético Ciutat de Palma. She stayed for one season then made a transfer to Barcelona, which had been anticipated by months of rumours.

In her first season with Barcelona, the team won the league and cup double. In September and October 2012 Torrecilla played in her first UEFA Women's Champions League matches, as Barcelona were hopelessly worsted 7–0 by Arsenal over two legs.

After three seasons at Barcelona she moved to Montpellier HSC ahead of the 2015–16 campaign. In July 2019, Torrecilla returned to the Primera División, signing a two-year deal with reigning champions Atlético Madrid.

International career
In 2012 Torrecilla was proud to be part of the Spain team which reached the final of the 2012 UEFA Women's U-19 Championship, where they were beaten 1–0 by Sweden after extra time.

Torrecilla made her senior debut for the Spain women's national football team in June 2013, a 2–2 friendly draw with Denmark in Vejle. The following day, national team coach Ignacio Quereda confirmed her as a member of his 23-player squad for the UEFA Women's Euro 2013 finals in Sweden. As the youngest player in the squad, Torrecilla was surprised but happy to be included. Although generally deployed as a defensive midfielder by Barcelona, she was content to play anywhere required by the national team.

She was part of Spain's squad at the 2015 FIFA Women's World Cup in Canada and the 2019 FIFA Women's World Cup in France.

International goals

Honours

Club

Barcelona
 Primera División: Winner 2012–13, 2013–14, 2014–15
 Copa de la Reina de Fútbol: Winner 2013, 2014

International
 Algarve Cup: Winner 2017
 Cyprus Cup: Winner, 2018

Personal life 
On 21 May 2020, Torrecilla announced that she had been diagnosed with a brain tumor. She underwent successful surgery on 18 May, losing her hair in the process. She returned to training in March 2021. She returned to the pitch on January 23, 2022, and started as a sub in the Supercopa final match against FC Barcelona. Torrecilla came in 85' with a standing ovation from the public. Atlético lost the match 7-0.

References

External links
 Virginia Torrecilla at BDFútbol
 
 
 Profile  at Montpellier HSC
 Profile at FC Barcelona
 

1994 births
Living people
People from Son Servera
Spanish women's footballers
Spain women's international footballers
Footballers from Mallorca
Primera División (women) players
Atlético Madrid Femenino players
FC Barcelona Femení players
Montpellier HSC (women) players
Expatriate women's footballers in France
Spanish expatriate women's footballers
Women's association football fullbacks
Women's association football midfielders
Women's association football forwards
Women's association football utility players
2015 FIFA Women's World Cup players
UD Collerense (women) players
Division 1 Féminine players
2019 FIFA Women's World Cup players
UEFA Women's Euro 2017 players
Spain women's youth international footballers